John David Sykes (born 24 August 1956) was a British Conservative politician.

Parliamentary career
Sykes contested Sheffield Hillsborough at the 1987 general election, being beaten into third place.

He was Member of Parliament (MP) for Scarborough from 1992 to 1997.  Following boundary changes at the 1997 general election, Sykes contested the redrawn seat of Scarborough and Whitby, but lost to the Labour candidate Lawrie Quinn by 5,124 votes. He re-fought the seat in 2001 but was again beaten by Quinn.

References
Times Guide to the House of Commons, Times Newspapers Limited, 1997

External links 
 

1956 births
Living people
Conservative Party (UK) MPs for English constituencies
UK MPs 1992–1997